Henri Brière (13 December 1873 - 25 March 1957) was a French politician. He represented the Democratic Republican Alliance in the Chamber of Deputies from 1928 to 1936.

References

1873 births
1957 deaths
People from Orne
Politicians from Normandy
Democratic and Social Action politicians
Republican Centre politicians
Members of the 14th Chamber of Deputies of the French Third Republic
Members of the 15th Chamber of Deputies of the French Third Republic
French military personnel of World War I